Oosterbeek is a railway station located in Oosterbeek, Netherlands. The station opened on 16 May 1845 and is on the Amsterdam–Arnhem railway (Rhijnspoorweg). The station was originally called Oosterbeek Hoog, as there was also a station called Oosterbeek Laag, meaning Lower Oosterbeek. This railway station was located on the Arnhem–Nijmegen railway. The station is the least used on the Amsterdam–Arnhem railway, with less than 600 passengers per day.

Train services
, the following train services call at this station:
Local Sprinter service: Ede-Wageningen - Arnhem

External links
NS website 
Dutch Public Transport journey planner 

Railway stations in Gelderland
Railway stations opened in 1845
Railway stations on the Rhijnspoorweg
Buildings and structures in Renkum
Railway stations in the Netherlands opened in 1845